Hakha (formerly rendered Haka) is the capital of Chin State in Myanmar.

Although it is relatively small in land area, it is the largest city of Chin State, as well as its capital city, with the plateau significantly larger than that of other towns in Chin State. It is estimated that Hakha has enough land and full capacity to extend to as ten times its current township area. 

As Chin State is quite hilly, Hakha is built on the slope of a large mountain, in a U shape. There is only one main road running along the middle of the city, in a curved U, and the whole city is built along this road.  Another road runs from the middle of the city, for a short while, forming the foot of U. Hakha is in the center of Chin State and it is connected with Thantlang, Falam, Gangaw, and Matupi by truck roads.

History
Hakha was founded around 1400 by the Lai ethnic group. The area was ruled by local chiefs for many generations and it consisted of more than 600 houses when the British troops arrived in Hakha in 1889.

The British occupied Hakha on 19 January 1890, as part of their operation to "subdue the wild tribes" in the Arakan Hills Division, as the area was then called. The British government later established a sub-divisional office and Hakha became a town a few years later.

The first American Baptist missionary couple, Arthur Carson (1860-1908) and his wife Laura (1858-1942) who arrived in Hakha on March 15, 1899 opened a mission station. Later other missionaries joined them and did extensive mission works throughout the Chin Hills and converted most of the Northern Chin State to Christianity within a century. This missionary work brought education, development, social and economic changes, and health improvement to the Chin people. The main contribution to language education was by Chester Strait of Wisconsin (1893-1985) who opened the Chin Hills Bible School in 1928 with thirteen students - four from the Tedim area of the Zomi people, four from Falam and five from the Haka areas of the Laimi, another branch of the Chin people. Although the teaching was in the Lai language after six months all students were able to write their final exam in the language.

During the Second World War, Hakha was captured by Japanese troops on 11 November 1943; it was later recaptured by British troops.

When Burma gained independence from British control in 1948, Hakha became an important city as the center for one of the subdivisions in the Chin Special Division, of which Falam was the capital at that time. The Chin Special Division was abolished reformed as the Chin State in 1974, at which time Hakha became the capital of the Chin State. That brought an influx of government workers, and housing development and extension of the city. Hakha eventually became the largest city in the Chin State with about 20,000 people. Hakha was part of the newly formed district:Hakha District on 1 June 2012.

Geography and climate

Hakha features a subtropical highland climate (Cwb) under the Köppen climate classification. Because it is located in the outer tropics, Hakha experiences three seasons – cool, warm and rainy. Because of the high altitude, the temperatures are always much cooler than those in the plains.

During the cool season months, the days are pleasant to warm but the mornings are quite cold. It is also very windy in winter. The whole city is foggy in the morning and in the evening. During the month of January 2009 there was a cold wave that hit Burma.

The total rainfall is about  every year.

The Burmese meteorology department has issued daily weather reports since 1988, but does not issue warnings of predicted heat waves or cold snaps.

Culture
 Chin State Cultural Museum
Rev. Van Hre Villa (Chin Traditional House)
Missionaries' Cemetery
East Bungalow
Hakha Baptist Church

Education
 Hakha College
 Hakha Educational College
Chin Christian University 
Government Technical Institute, Hakha

Sport
The 4,000-seat Wanthu Maung Stadium, a home stadium for Chin United F.C is still under construction.

References

External links

 Hakha Bible
 Lai Wikipedia
 Maplandia World Gazetteer
 Ministries and government organizations at Hakha

Township capitals of Myanmar
Populated places in Chin State